Qlaudia (or Claudia) was a diocese in the Syriac Orthodox metropolitan province of Melitene (Malatya), attested between the tenth and thirteenth centuries.  Sixteen Jacobite bishops of Qlaudia are mentioned either by Michael the Syrian or Bar Hebraeus.  By 1283, as a result of several decades of warfare and brigandage, the diocese of Qlaudia was ruined.  The diocese is not again mentioned, and seems to have lapsed around the end of the thirteenth century.

Sources 

The main primary source for the Jacobite bishops of Qlaudia is the record of episcopal consecrations appended to Volume III of the Chronicle of the Jacobite patriarch Michael the Syrian (1166–99).  In this Appendix Michael listed most of the bishops consecrated by the Jacobite patriarchs of Antioch between the ninth and twelfth centuries.  Twenty-eight Jacobite patriarchs sat during this period, and in many cases Michael was able to list the names of the bishops consecrated during their reigns, their monasteries of origin, and the place where they were consecrated.  For the thirteenth century, Michael's lists are supplemented by several references in the Chronicon Syriacum and Chronicon Ecclesiasticum of the Jacobite maphrian Bar Hebraeus (ob.1286).

Location 
Qlaudia was a district near Melitene (modern Malatya), in eastern Turkey.

Bishops of Qlaudia 
Fourteen bishops of Qlaudia are mentioned in the lists of Michael the Syrian.

The bishop Dionysius of Qlaudia is mentioned in several sources for the middle decades of the thirteenth century.

In 1283, according to Bar Hebraeus, the diocese of Qlaudia and the other suffragan dioceses of the province of Melitene were ruined:

Even if I wanted to be patriarch, as many others do, what is there to covet in the appointment, since so many dioceses of the East have been devastated?  Should I set my heart on Antioch, where sighs and groans will meet me?  Or the holy diocese of Gumal, where nobody is left to piss against a wall?  Or Aleppo, or Mabbugh, or Callinicus, or Edessa, or Harran, all deserted?  Or Laqabin, ʿArqa, Qlisura, Semha, Gubos, Qlaudia and Gargar—the seven dioceses around Melitene—where not a soul remains?

Despite the gloomy testimony of Bar Hebraeus, there is evidence that the diocese of Qlaudia continued to exist at this period.  According to the colophon of a contemporary manuscript, the metropolitan Ignatius 'of Qlaudia, which is Qust', was among the fifteen bishops consecrated by the patriarch Philoxenus Nemrud (1283–92).

The diocese of Qlaudia is not mentioned in any later source, and probably lapsed around the end of the thirteenth century.

Notes

References 
 
 
 Jean-Baptiste Chabot, Chronique de Michel le Syrien, Patriarche Jacobite d'Antiche (1166-1199). Éditée pour la première fois et traduite en francais I-IV (1899;1901;1905;1910; a supplement to volume I containing an introduction to Michael and his work, corrections, and an index, was published in 1924. Reprinted in four volumes 1963, 2010).

Syriac Orthodox dioceses
Oriental Orthodoxy in Turkey